Independent Township is a township in Barton County, Kansas, United States.  As of the 2010 census, its population was 758.

Independent Township was organized in 1875.

Geography
According to the USGS, it contains two cemeteries: Bloomingdale and Pleasant View.

References
 USGS Geographic Names Information System (GNIS)

External links
 City-Data.com

Townships in Barton County, Kansas
Townships in Kansas